Tampea nodosa is a moth in the subfamily Arctiinae. It was described by Jeremy Daniel Holloway in 2001. It is found on Borneo. The habitat consists of lower montane forests and alluvial forests.

The forewings are yellow and the hindwings grey with yellower costal and distal margins.

References

Moths described in 2001
Lithosiini